Alchemy Partners is a British private equity firm, which specialises in investing in distressed and undervalued or underperforming businesses and other special situations through debt and equity throughout Europe.  

Alchemy was founded in 1997 by Martin Bolland and Jon Moulton. Before launching dedicated distressed vehicles, it invested over £1bn of equity in over 80 transactions. Notable transactions included Four Seasons Health Care, Alcentra and Phoenix IT.
 	
Alchemy came to public notice in 1999, when it was negotiating to buy Rover Group from BMW; its advisory board members included former Rover MD Kevin Morley. After public protests, the discussions were abandoned when the government imposed additional conditions to the transaction.

Alchemy launched its first distressed debt fund, Alchemy Special Opportunities, in 2006 with a final close of £300m.

Moulton resigned from Alchemy in September 2009, saying that he disagreed with plans by other partners to turn Alchemy into a specialist financial services firm. 

Alchemy raised £500m for the second distressed debt fund in 2010 and £600m for Alchemy Special Opportunities Fund III in March 2014. A fourth fund was announced in August 2017.

The Funds invest in the debt and equity of public and private companies in the UK and continental Europe. Funding is provided by a large number of blue-chip investors including major banks, pension funds, fund-of-funds, university endowments and high-net-worth individuals. Today the firm manages over £1.5bn.

Alchemy is structured as an advisory business based in London, Alchemy Partners LLP, which advises a fund manager based in Guernsey, Alchemy Partners (Guernsey) Ltd.

References

External links 
 

Private equity firms of the United Kingdom